The Earlies are a band formed by Christian Madden and Giles Hatton from Lancashire, England, and Brandon Carr and John Mark Lapham from the United States. They are notable for blending elements from a wide range of musical genres and have been described as both "a very English kind of folk-psychedelia... with a smattering of Beach Boys harmonies" by The Independent, and "country-meets-prog-meets-electronica symphonies" by The Guardian.

In the late 1990s, prior to his Earlies days, Lapham released ambient electronic music, under the name Autio, on Manchester record label Beatnik Records. Hatton recorded as Atomic Clock for the same label.

The band are notable for using a large live line-up consisting of 11 members who play an eclectic range of instruments, including the flute, the tuba, the cello, a set of turntables and a synthesizer, alongside the more traditional rock instruments. The full line-up of the band last played live headlining the Green Man Festival in 2007.

Carr took an indefinite break from the band to teach at ATEMS High School in Abilene, Texas, although he is no longer listed as a faculty member (as of December 31, 2020).

In 2015, after a long hiatus, The Earlies returned with new material and scheduled live appearances. The band will be performing a one-off festival show at the fifth Cloudspotting Festival in England, followed by a short tour of the UK in the last week of July. A new EP, Message from Home, is also expected in 2015.

The Earlies played and produced parts of Jinnwoo's debut album, 'Strangers Bring Me No Light', released September 2016.

Discography

Albums
 These Were the Earlies (2005)
 The Enemy Chorus (2007)

EPs
 Message from Home (expected 2015)

Chart singles
 "Morning Wonder" (2004) - UK #67
 "Bring It Back Again" - UK #61

The band also recorded a cover of Tim Buckley's "I Must've Been Blind", for the 2005 tribute album, Dream Brother: The Songs of Tim and Jeff Buckley.

References

External links
 2004 BBC interview with the Earlies
 Band page on the Secretly Canadian label website

British rock music groups
British folk music groups
American rock music groups
American folk musical groups
679 Artists artists
Secretly Canadian artists
Grönland Records artists